The Upper Skagit Indian Tribe is a federally recognized Native American tribe located in the state of Washington. Before European colonization, the tribe occupied lands along the Skagit River, from as far downstream as present-day Mount Vernon, Washington, and villages going north as far as Newhalem along the Skagit River, as well as lands on the Baker, and the Sauk rivers.

Culturally, the Upper Skagit share characteristics with the Lower Skagit and the Coast Salish, as well as the Plateau Indians on the eastern side of the Cascade Mountains. They traditionally spoke Lushootseed, part of the Salishan language family. It was spoken by many coastal tribes of the Northwest.

Upper Skagit Indian Reservation
The Upper Skagit Indian Reservation consists of three separate small parcels of land in western Skagit County.
. The total land area is approximately 100 acres (0.404686 km²). Its resident population was 238 persons as of the 2000 census.

The Tribe owns several successful businesses including The Skagit Casino Resort with the Encore, The Market Buffet and Express Eats restaurants, The Skagit Ridge Hotel, Bow Hill Gas and Food Mart, and the Highway 20 Hometown Pharmacy.

See also 
 Lower Skagit

Notes

References

External links
 Upper Skagit Indian Tribe, official website
 The Skagit Casino Resort
 Encore
 The Market Buffet
 Express Eats
 Skagit Ridge Hotel
 Upper Skagit Tribe, NW Indian Fisheries Commission
 Upper Skagit Tribe, NW Portland Indian Health Board

History of Washington (state)
Lushootseed language
Native American tribes in Washington (state)